Fightland (2021) was a professional wrestling supercard event produced by Major League Wrestling (MLW), which was held on October 2, 2021 and was the third event under the Fightland chronology. Matches from the event were taped for MLW programming; the main card aired as a one-hour special on October 7, 2021 on Vice TV, while other matches would air as part of the mini-series, MLW Fusion: Alpha, on MLW's YouTube channel and BeIN Sports USA.

Sixteen professional wrestling matches were contested at the event. The main event was a no disqualification title vs. title match, in which Battle Riot winner Alexander Hammerstone cashed in his Golden Ticket opportunity against Jacob Fatu, with both Hammerstone's National Openweight Championship and Fatu's World Heavyweight Championship on the line. Hammerstone won the match to end Fatu's two-year long title reign in what was also Fatu's first loss in MLW. On the undercard, Tajiri made his MLW debut against Myron Reed, Arez and Aramis for Reed's World Middleweight Championship in a four-way match, which Tajiri won.

Production

Background
The show featured wrestling matches that resulted from scripted storylines, where wrestlers portrayed villains, heroes, orless distinguishable characters in the scripted events that built tension and culminated in a wrestling match or series of matches.

In April 2021, MLW announced a television deal with Vice TV. A block of MLW programming, including reruns of MLW Fusion, began airing on Saturdays starting May 1. On September 17, 2021, it was announced that Vice TV would air Fightland on October 7, following a new episode of its original documentary series, Dark Side of the Ring. As an expansion of the channel's professional wrestling programming, and their previous agreement with MLW, Fightland marks the first wrestling event to air on Vice.

Storylines 
The card consisted of matches that resulted from scripted storylines, where wrestlers portrayed villains, heroes, or less distinguishable characters in scripted events that built tension and culminated in a wrestling match or series of matches, with results predetermined by MLW's writers. Storylines were played out on MLW's weekly television program, Fusion, and the league's social media platforms.

The main storyline heading into Fightland was the feud between MLW National Openweight Champion Alexander Hammerstone and MLW World Heavyweight Champion Jacob Fatu of Contra Unit. At the end of the AAA vs. MLW Super Series on the May 10, 2020 episode of Fusion, Contra Unit attacked various wrestlers and staff before ultimately taking over MLW headquarters (a storyline explanation for MLW's hiatus during the COVID-19 pandemic). Hammerstone was among members of the MLW roster seen taking back MLW headquarters in a video uploaded to MLW's YouTube channel on October 29, 2020. Hammerstone campaigned for a World title shot throughout 2020 and into 2021, as he was ranked #1 in MLW by Pro Wrestling Illustrated. At the end of the April 21, 2021 episode of Fusion, Hammerstone once again challenged Fatu to a title match. The following week, on the penultimate episode of the season, Contra leader Josef Samael denied the challenge on Fatu's behalf, claiming that he ultimately controls who gets to fight him. On June 10, 2021, it was announced that Battle Riot III will take place on July 10, and that Hammerstone would be the first entrant. Hammerstone would ultimately win the titular match, earning a World title match against Fatu. On September 1, 2021, Hammerstone revealed he will face Fatu at Fightland, and put his own National Openweight title on the line in a Title vs. title match.

On August 31, it was announced on MLW's website that Tajiri would be making his MLW debut at Fightland. On September 16, it was announced that Myron Reed would defend the World Middleweight Championship against Tajiri, Arez and Aramis in a four-way match at Fightland.

Results

References

External links
Major League Wrestling official website

Events in Philadelphia
2021 in professional wrestling
Major League Wrestling shows
October 2021 sports events in the United States
Professional wrestling in Philadelphia